Petr Kralert (born 20 October 1979) is a former professional tennis player from the Czech Republic.

Tennis career

Juniors
Kralert had a good year as a junior in 1996, when he won the Banana Bowl; was a doubles champion at the Orange Bowl, partnering countryman Robin Vik; and bagelled Roger Federer when he beat the future World No. 1 in the Sunshine Cup. He reached as high as No. 19 in the junior world singles rankings (and No. 16 in doubles).

Pro tour
In 1999 he made an appearance for the Czech Republic Davis Cup team, in a World Group play-off tie against Uzbekistan. He defeated Oleg Ogorodov in the fourth rubber, to help the Czechs secure a clean sweep.

Kralert qualified for his only Grand Slam tournament in 2000, at the US Open. He had a win over Spain's David Sánchez in the first round, then lost in the second round to Agustín Calleri.

Challenger titles

Singles: (2)

References

1979 births
Living people
Czech male tennis players
Tennis players from Prague